Samuel S. Raia is a Republican Party politician who is the former of Mayor of Saddle River, New Jersey and past Chairman of the New Jersey Republican State Committee. 

Raia has served as mayor of Saddle River from 2009 to 2017 and had served on the town council prior to his election. He is a member of the Board of Directors of Hackensack University Medical Center.

References

Living people
Year of birth missing (living people)
People from Saddle River, New Jersey
Chairmen of the New Jersey Republican State Committee
New Jersey Republicans
Mayors of places in New Jersey